Udo Di Fabio (born 26 March 1954, in Duisburg) is a German jurist. He is a former judge of the Federal Constitutional Court of Germany, Germany's highest court, where he served as a member of the Second Senate from December 1999 until December 2011.

Biography
In 1970 Di Fabio began as a local government official in middle service in Dinslaken. He completed his secondary school diploma and then studied law at the Ruhr University in Bochum as well as social sciences at the University of Duisburg (now University of Duisburg-Essen). After completing the two state examinations in law in 1982 and 1985, Di Fabio was a judge at the Duisburg Social Court. In 1986 he worked as a wissenschaftlicher Mitarbeiter (scientific assistant) at the Institute for Public Law at the University of Bonn. In 1987, he achieved there his dissertation , followed by a doctorate in the subject of social sciences in 1990. He completed his habilitation in 1993. Then he was appointed university professor for public law at the Westfälische Wilhelms-Universität Münster, followed by a call to the University of Trier. From 1997 to 2003 Di Fabio was Professor of Public Law at the Ludwig Maximilians University in Munich, since 2003 he has been Professor for Public Law at the Rheinische Friedrich-Wilhelms-Universität in Bonn. From 1999 to 2011 he was Judge of the Federal Constitutional Court. In 2011, he was holder of the Mercator professorship at the University of Duisburg-Essen.

In April 2020, Di Fabio was appointed by Minister-President Armin Laschet of North Rhine-Westphalia to a 12-member expert group to advise on economic and social consequences of the COVID-19 pandemic in Germany.

Other activities
 Friedrich August von Hayek Foundation, Member of the Board of Trustees
 German Institute for International and Security Affairs (SWP), Member of the Council
 Deutsche Telekom Stiftung, Member of the Board of Trustees
 Vodafone Germany Foundation, Member of the Advisory Board
 Foundation for Family Businesses, Member of Board of Trustees
 German Reference Centre (DRZE), Member of the Board of Trustees

Personal life
Di Fabio is married, has four children and lives in Bonn.

References

External links

1954 births
Living people
Academic staff of the University of Bonn
Justices of the Federal Constitutional Court
Academic staff of the University of Münster
German scholars of constitutional law
Grand Crosses with Star and Sash of the Order of Merit of the Federal Republic of Germany
20th-century German judges
21st-century German judges